Neutronium (sometimes shortened to neutrium, also referred to as neutrite) is a hypothetical substance composed purely of neutrons. The word was coined by scientist Andreas von Antropoff in 1926 (before the 1932 discovery of the neutron) for the hypothetical "element of atomic number zero" (with zero protons in its nucleus) that he placed at the head of the periodic table (denoted by -, or Nu). However, the meaning of the term has changed over time, and from the last half of the 20th century onward it has been also used to refer to extremely dense substances resembling the neutron-degenerate matter theorized to exist in the cores of neutron stars; hereinafter "degenerate neutronium" will refer to this.

In neutron stars

Neutronium is used in popular physics literature to refer to the material present in the cores of neutron stars (stars which are too massive to be supported by electron degeneracy pressure and which collapse into a denser phase of matter). This term is very rarely used in scientific literature, for three reasons: there are multiple definitions for the term "neutronium"; there is considerable uncertainty over the composition of the material in the cores of neutron stars (it could be neutron-degenerate matter, strange matter, quark matter, or a variant or combination of the above); the properties of neutron star material should depend on depth due to changing pressure (see below), and no sharp boundary between the crust (consisting primarily of atomic nuclei) and almost protonless inner layer is expected to exist.

When neutron star core material is presumed to consist mostly of free neutrons, it is typically referred to as neutron-degenerate matter in scientific literature.

In the periodic table
The term "neutronium" was coined in 1926 by Andreas von Antropoff for a conjectured form of matter made up of neutrons with no protons or electrons, which he placed as the chemical element of atomic number zero at the head of his new version of the periodic table. It was subsequently placed in the middle of several spiral representations of the periodic system for classifying the chemical elements, such as those of Charles Janet (1928), E. I. Emerson (1944), and John D. Clark (1950).

Although the term is not used in the scientific literature either for a condensed form of matter, or as an element, there have been reports that, besides the free neutron, there may exist two bound forms of neutrons without protons. If neutronium were considered to be an element, then these neutron clusters could be considered to be the isotopes of that element. However, these reports have not been further substantiated.
 Mononeutron: An isolated neutron undergoes beta decay with a mean lifetime of approximately 15 minutes (half-life of approximately 10 minutes), becoming a proton (the nucleus of hydrogen), an electron, and an antineutrino.
 Dineutron: The dineutron, containing two neutrons, was unambiguously observed in 2012 in the decay of beryllium-16. It is not a bound particle, but had been proposed as an extremely short-lived resonance state produced by nuclear reactions involving tritium. It has been suggested to have a transitory existence in nuclear reactions produced by helions (completely ionized helium-3 nuclei) that result in the formation of a proton and a nucleus having the same atomic number as the target nucleus but a mass number two units greater. The dineutron hypothesis had been used in nuclear reactions with exotic nuclei for a long time. Several applications of the dineutron in nuclear reactions can be found in review papers. Its existence has been proven to be relevant for nuclear structure of exotic nuclei. A system made up of only two neutrons is not bound, though the attraction between them is very nearly enough to make them so. This has some consequences on nucleosynthesis and the abundance of the chemical elements.
 Trineutron: A trineutron state consisting of three bound neutrons has not been detected, and is not expected to exist even for a short time.
 Tetraneutron: A tetraneutron is a hypothetical particle consisting of four bound neutrons. Reports of its existence have not been replicated.
 Pentaneutron: Calculations indicate that the hypothetical pentaneutron state, consisting of a cluster of five neutrons, would not be bound.

Although not called "neutronium", the National Nuclear Data Center's Nuclear Wallet Cards lists as its first "isotope" an "element" with the symbol n and atomic number Z = 0 and mass number A = 1.

Properties 

Neutron matter is equivalent to a chemical element with atomic number 0, which is to say that it is equivalent to a species of atoms having no protons in their atomic nuclei. It is extremely radioactive; its only legitimate equivalent isotope, the free neutron, has a half-life of 10 minutes, which is approximately half that of the most stable known isotope of francium. Neutron matter decays quickly into hydrogen. Neutron matter has no electronic structure on account of its total lack of electrons. 

While this lifetime is long enough to permit the study of neutronium's chemical properties, there are serious practical problems. Having no charge or electrons, neutronium would not interact strongly with ordinary low-energy photons (visible light) and would feel no electrostatic forces, so it would diffuse into the walls of most containers made of ordinary matter. Certain materials are able to resist diffusion or absorption of ultracold neutrons due to nuclear-quantum effects, specifically reflection caused by the strong interaction. At ambient temperature and in the presence of other elements, thermal neutrons readily undergo neutron capture to form heavier (and often radioactive) isotopes of that element.

Neutron matter at standard pressure and temperature is predicted by the ideal gas law to be less dense than even hydrogen, with a density of only  (roughly 27 times less dense than air and half as dense as hydrogen gas). Neutron matter is expected to remain gaseous down to absolute zero at normal pressures, as the zero-point energy of the system is too high to allow condensation. However, neutron matter should in theory form a degenerate gaseous superfluid at these temperatures, composed of transient neutron-pairs called dineutrons. Under extremely low pressure, this low temperature, gaseous superfluid should exhibit quantum coherence producing a Bose–Einstein condensate. At higher temperatures, neutron matter will only condense with sufficient pressure, and solidify with even greater pressure. Such pressures exist in neutron stars, where the extreme pressure causes the neutron matter to become degenerate. However, in the presence of atomic matter compressed to the state of electron degeneracy, β− decay may be inhibited due to the Pauli exclusion principle, thus making free neutrons stable. Also, elevated pressures should make neutrons degenerate themselves.

Compared to ordinary elements, neutronium should be more compressible due to the absence of electrically charged protons and electrons. This makes neutronium more energetically favorable than (positive-Z) atomic nuclei and leads to their conversion to (degenerate) neutronium through electron capture, a process that is believed to occur in stellar cores in the final seconds of the lifetime of massive stars, where it is facilitated by cooling via  emission. It was theorized that extreme pressures of order  might deform the neutrons into a cubic symmetry, allowing tighter packing of neutrons, or cause a strange matter formation.

See also
 Compact star

References

Further reading
 

Astrophysics
Exotic matter
Neutron
Fictional materials